

List of current consorts of sovereigns

Unmarried sovereigns 
 Norodom Sihamoni, King of Cambodia, who is personally committed to a monastic way of life. 
 Pope Francis, being an ordained priest of the Catholic Church, is sworn to celibacy.

Sovereigns with a deceased consort 
 Margrethe II, Queen of Denmark. She married Henri de Laborde de Monpezat. He died on 13 February 2018 at Fredensborg Palace.
 Hans Adam II, Sovereign Prince of Liechtenstein. He married Marie Kinsky of Wchinitz and Tettau. She died on 21 August 2021 at Cantonal Hospital in Grabs.

References 

Consorts